This is a list of songs written by Jack Keller.  Keller (1936–2005) was an American songwriter whose work spans six decades.

Notes
 French language version by Keller/Goffin/Roblin
 BMI credits Goffin-Keller, Songwriters Hall of Fame credits Goffin-King
 Unreleased 
 record label for Arena Twins lists songwriting credit as "B. Mann - N. Sherman"
 the "wild gypsy brass band version" of "One Way Ticket (To The Blues)"
 Brazilian, translation by Fred Jorge
 as "Dansez Le Turkey Trot", translation by Donald Lautrec
 also as "Passaje De Ida"

References

Keller, Jack